Coimbatore West was a legislative assembly constituency in the Indian state of Tamil Nadu. It covers parts of Coimbatore. Coimbatore East assembly constituency is a part of the Coimbatore parliamentary constituency. After 2008 delimitation, this constituency became defunct.

Members of Legislative Assembly

Election results

1962

References

External links
 

Former assembly constituencies of Tamil Nadu
Government of Tiruchirappalli